Chalong is a sub-district (tambon) in the southern portion of Phuket Province, Thailand. It is one of eight sub-districts in the capital district (amphoe mueang) Mueang Phuket.

Sights

The most important of the 29 Buddhist temples on Phuket is Wat Chalong (วัดฉลอง, วัดไชยธาราราม). It is dedicated to two monks, Luang Pho Chaem (หลวงพ่อแช่ม) and Luang Pho Chuang (หลวงพ่อช่วง), who with their knowledge of herbal medicine helped the injured of a tin miners rebellion in 1876.

Geography
Neighboring tambons are (from south clockwise) Rawai, Karon, Patong, and Kathu of Kathu District and Wichit. To the southeast is Chalong Bay, with one of touristy beaches of the island.

Administration 
The tambon is administered by a tambon administrative organization (TAO) created in 1995. It is divided into 10 villages (muban).
Khao Noi (เขาน้อย)
Bon Suan (บนสวน)
Pa Lai (ป่าไล่)
Na Yai (นาใหญ่)
Na Kok (นากก)
Chalong (ฉลอง)
Wat Mai (วัดใหม่)
Khok Sai (โคกทราย)
Khok Tanot (โคกโตนด)
Yot Sane (ยอดเสน่ห์)

Climate

References

External links

phuketchalong.go.th Chalong TAO (Thai)
thaitambon.com (Thai)
Chalong local weather station (English)

Tambon of Phuket Province